The Ente Autonomo Volturno S.r.l., also known by the acronym EAV, is a company that operates in the sector of public transport by road, rail and cableway, in the Campania Region.

It was born in 1904 on the initiative of the municipality of Naples as an independent body for the construction and management of a hydroelectric plant on the Volturno river, completed in 1909 and operational since 1916. Subsequently the body entered various other sectors including that of public transport with the purchase, in 1931, of the Azienda Tramviaria of the Municipality of Naples. Subsequently, it performed the tasks of contracting station and group which included railway and automobile transport operators as well as cable cars, such as Circumvesuviana, MetroCampania NordEst and SEPSA. In 2012, on the initiative of the Campania Region, it incorporated the aforementioned companies, taking over the management of services as both infrastructure manager and railway company.

History

Activities

Public transport

Railway services 

Ente Autonomo Volturno manages on behalf of the Campania Region, which owns it, the isolated railways Circumflegrea, Circumvesuviana and Cumana to which are added the Alifana, Benevento-Cancello railways (also called Caudina railway) and the Naples-Giugliano-Aversa line.

The Circumvesuviana railway network includes the following sections: Botteghelle-San Giorgio a Cremano, Naples-Nola-Baiano, Naples-Ottaviano-Sarno, Naples-Pompeii-Poggiomarino, Pomigliano d'Arco-Acerra and Torre Annunziata-Sorrento. The overall length of the six relations is 142.367 km for a total extension of 203.447 km. All reports are Italian narrow gauge (950 mm); there are a total of 96 stations, with a density of one station every 1.5 km, all with railway platforms. Tourist services are also available on the network: Sorrento Express, connection between Naples and the centers of the Sorrento peninsula carried out with the first restored electromotives, Napoli Express, connection between Naples and Sorrento carried out with a more modern electric train, and the Campania Express, which connects the stations of Naples, Herculaneum, Pompeii and Sorrento with a Metrostar train. The entire Circumvesuviana network carries about 70,200 travelers a day for a total of nearly 26 million passengers a year.

The network made up of the Circumflegrea and Cumana railways boasts a total length of 47 km and connects the stations of Montesanto, in Naples, and Torregaveta, in Bacoli. It carries about 37,000 travelers a day, for a total of 13.5 million travelers a year.

Automotive services

Faito tramway 
The Faito tramway connects the center of Castellammare di Stabia with Mobnte Faito in the summer period, right in the part that falls within the city of Vico Equense, in 8 minutes. The lift was opened in 1952 and completely modernized in 1990. The cableway service was suspended in 2013. The reopening, after modernization and consolidation works, initially scheduled for 25 April 2016, took place on 4 May of the same year.

Part of the rolling stock

References

External links 

 Brief mention of the history of the EAV (in Italian), on enteautonomovolturno.it.

Naples Metro
Transport in Naples
Rapid transit in Italy
Companies based in Campania
Transport organisations based in Italy
Italian companies established in 1904
Transport companies established in 1904